The Delaware International Speedway is a motorsport venue in Delaware. It a 1/2 mile clay oval track, located in Delmar, Delaware along with its sister track the US 13 Dragway.  The track seats 5,000 and is one of Delaware's largest attractions.

External links
Delaware International Speedway

Motorsport venues in Delaware
Buildings and structures in Sussex County, Delaware
Tourist attractions in Sussex County, Delaware